Vernon Redding (October 7, 1866 – ?) was an architect in Mansfield, Ohio. He designed the Ashland County Courthouse (Ohio), Huron County Courthouse and Jail (1913) and one or more buildings in Center Street Historic District (Ashland, Ohio). He also designed Mansfield's Carnegie library built in 1908. Several buildings he designed are listed on the National Register of Historic Places (NRHP).

Herbert S. Jones and William L. Althouse, who went on to form Althouse & Jones, began their careers working for Redding.

Work
A. C. Edmondson Residence at 297 Mt. Vernon Avenue in Marion, Ohio.
Adam Howard House at 230 South Boston Street in Galion, Ohio. NRHP listed
City Hall and Opera House, 156 N. Water St. Loudonville, Ohio. NRHP listed
May Realty Building at 22-32 South Park Street in Mansfield. NRHP listed
Ohio Power Company building at 604 Main Street in Zanesville, Ohio. NRHP listed
Mansfield Savings Bank building NRHP listed
2-story brick business block in Loudenville
Ohio Theatre in Loudonville NRHP listed
Farmers Bank Building, now Chase Bank
Leland Hotel, formerly the tallest building in Mansfield (demolished in 1976)
Barrington Building
The Rigby House NRHP listed
Balgreen Farm house on Marion Avenue Road
The Kern House
Central United Methodist
Mansfield General Hospital
Clubhouse at Westbrook
Ashland County Courthouse at W. 2nd St. in Ashland, Ohio. NRHP listed
Huron County Courthouse and Jail on E. Main St. and Benedict Avenure in Norwalk, Ohio. NRHP listed.

See also
National Register of Historic Places listings in Richland County, Ohio
Citizens Bank of Shelby 1911
29 W Main St 
Shelby, OH 
Richland county

References

1866 births
Year of death missing
People from Mansfield, Ohio
American theatre architects
Architects from Ohio
20th-century American architects